The 9th Central Committee of the Lao People's Revolutionary Party (LPRP) was elected at the 9th LPRP National Congress in 2011. It was composed of 61 members

Members

References

Specific

Bibliography
Articles:
 

9th Central Committee of the Lao People's Revolutionary Party
2011 establishments in Laos
2016 disestablishments in Laos